Brenda, That's All is the seventh studio album by American singer Brenda Lee. The album was released October 15, 1962 on Decca Records and was produced by Owen Bradley. It was the second of two studio albums released in 1962 and included two Top 10 hit singles on the Billboard Hot 100 between 1962 and 1963.

Background and content 
Brenda, That's All was recorded in separate recording sessions at the Bradley Film and Recording Studio in Nashville, Tennessee, United States under the direction of Owen Bradley. The sessions began on March 8, 1962 and ended on August 9, 1962. Like her previous releases, the album contained twelve tracks of material and many of its tracks were cover versions of previously recorded material by other artists. It included cover versions of Marvin Rainwater's "Gonna Find Me a Bluebird", and Virgil F. Stewart's "Just Out of Reach". "Fool #1" was recorded by Loretta Lynn shortly before Lee's recording of the song. The album's tracks consisted of a variety of musical styles, including pop, R&B and country. The album received three and a half stars from Allmusic. Reviewer Richie Unterberger commented that while the album was not a "scintillating record" it was "pretty good" because it did not over-emphasize pop standards, and that the whole album "is impressively sung and immaculately produced, in fact, in common with much of what Lee recorded under Owen Bradley's direction." The album was originally released as an LP record with six songs included on each side of the record. The album was later reissued on compact disc in the United Kingdom and was reissued on an extended play in Argentina.

Release 
The lead single released from the album was "You Can Depend on Me". Released in April 1961, the song became a Top 10 hit on the Billboard Hot 100, peaking at #6 and also reached #25 on the Billboard R&B music chart. Its B-side also gained significant airplay and reached #1 on the Billboard Bubbling Under Hot 100 chart. The second track of the album entitled "Fool #1" was released as the second and final single from the album. Released in September 1961, the song reached #3 on the Billboard Hot 100, becoming her eighth Top 10 single, while peaking at #38 on the UK Singles Chart in the United Kingdom.

The album was released on October 15, 1962 on Decca Records, and peaked at #20 on the Billboard 200 albums chart, while also reaching #13 on the UK Albums Chart, becoming her second album to chart in the United Kingdom.

Track listing 
Side one
 "I'm Sitting on Top of the World" (Ray Henderson, Sam M. Lewis, Joe Young) – 2:09
 "Fool #1" (Kathryn R. Fulton) – 2:27
 "White Silver Sands" (Red Matthews, Gladys Reinhart) – 3:06
 "Just Out of Reach" (Virgil F. Stewart) – 2:47
 "Sweethearts on Parade" (Carmen Lombardo, Charles Newman) – 2:34
 "It's a Lonesome Old Town (When You're Not Around)" (Charles Kisco, Harry Tobias) – 3:06

Side two
 "Organ Grinder's Swing" (Will Hudson, Mitchell Parish, Irving Mills) – 2:24
 "Gonna Find Me a Bluebird" (Marvin Rainwater) – 2:49
 "Why Me" (Bob Beckham, Buzz Cason) – 2:13
 "Valley of Tears" (Dave Bartholomew, Fats Domino) – 2:26
 "Someday (You'll Want Me to Want You)" (Jimmie Hodges) – 2:39
 "You Can Depend on Me" (Charles Carpenter, Louis Dunlap, Earl Hines) – 3:34

Personnel 
 Harold Bradley – guitar
 Floyd Cramer – piano
 Dottie Dillard – background vocals
 Ray Edenton – guitar
 Buddy Emmons – steel guitar
 Buddy Harman – drums
 Anita Kerr – background vocals
 Brenda Lee – lead vocals
 Grady Martin – guitar
 Bob Moore – bass
 Louis Nunley – background vocals
 Boots Randolph – saxophone
 Bill Wright – background vocals

Charts 
Album

Singles

References 

1962 albums
Brenda Lee albums
Albums produced by Owen Bradley
Decca Records albums